James Mulligan may refer to:
 James Venture Mulligan (1837–1907), Australian bushman and prospector
 James A. Mulligan (1829–1864), Civil War Union officer
 James Mulligan (Australian footballer) (born 1989), Australian footballer
 James H. Mulligan Jr. (1920–1996), American electrical engineer and professor
 James Henry Mulligan (1823–1892), Irish-born landowner and politician in Quebec
 James Hilary Mulligan (1844–1915), judge, politician and poet from Kentucky